State Highway 141 (SH 141) is a  long state highway in far western Colorado, United States.  Though nominally oriented north–south, SH 141 winds around a considerable amount due to the rugged terrain and ultimately forms a giant S shape. SH 141's southern terminus is at U.S. Route 491 (US 491) near Dove Creek, and the northern terminus is at Interstate 70 Business (I-70 Bus.) in Grand Junction. SH 141 is the longest three-digit state highway in Colorado.

Route description
Beginning west of Dove Creek, the highway runs north, then swings east to drop into a canyon and cross the Dolores River at Slick Rock. SH 141 follows the Dolores for a short while, then continues east through Gypsum Gap, then north through Broad Canyon. At a junction with  SH 145 the highway turns west through Naturita, then northwest following the San Miguel River to the Dolores River. It continues a winding path northwest along the Dolores to Gateway. There it turns northeast, running through the Unaweep Canyon to the Gunnison River valley where it joins  US 50 at Whitewater. The highway heads northwest alongside the Gunnison River, splitting off from US 50 as it nears Grand Junction. It heads north across the Colorado River and ends at a junction with  I-70 Bus. east of Grand Junction.

SH 141 between Naturita and Whitewater is part of the Colorado designated Unaweep Tabeguache Scenic Byway.

Major intersections

References

External links

141
Transportation in Dolores County, Colorado
Transportation in San Miguel County, Colorado
Transportation in Montrose County, Colorado
Transportation in Mesa County, Colorado
Grand Junction, Colorado